Ilsbach (in its upper course: Streitbach, in its middle course: Sausel) is a river of Hesse, Germany. It flows into the Seenbach in Mücke.

See also
List of rivers of Hesse

References

Rivers of Hesse
Rivers of the Vogelsberg
Rivers of Germany